This is a list of Guinean writers.

 Kesso Barry (born 1948), autobiographer also associated with Senegal
 Saïdou Bokoum (born 1945), novelist
 Sory Camara, anthropologist
 Ahmed Tidjani Cissé (born 1942), playwright
 Koumanthio Zeinab Diallo (born 1956), poet and novelist
 Alioum Fantouré (born 1938), economist and novelist
 Keita Fodeba (1921–1969), actor, politician and writer
 Lansiné Kaba, historian
 Fodéba Keïta (1921–1969), poet and dancer
 Siré Komara (born 1991), novelist: Mes Racines
 Camara Laye (1928–1980), novelist: The Black Child  
 Tierno Monénembo (born 1947), novelist: The Oldest Orphan, Les écailles du Ciel, Peulorihno, Le Roi de Kahel
 Condetto Nénékhaly-Camera (1930–1972), poet and playwright
 Djibril Tamsir Niane (1932–2021), novelist and historian
 Williams Sassine (1944–1997), French-language novelist 
 Sékou Touré (1922–1984), politician, political writer and occasional poet
 Mamadou Traoré, also known as Ray Autra (born 1916), teacher and poet

References 

Guinean
Writers
Guinean